The year 2009 is the 2nd year in the history of Jewels, a mixed martial arts promotion based in Japan. In 2009 Jewels held 6 events beginning with, Jewels 2nd Ring.

Events list

Jewels 2nd Ring

Jewels 2nd Ring was an event held on February 4, 2009 at Shinjuku Face in Tokyo, Japan.

Results

Jewels: Rough Stone: First Ring

Jewels: Rough Stone: First Ring was an event held on April 19, 2009 at the Isami Wrestle Budokan in Wairabi, Saitama, Japan.

Results

Jewels 3rd Ring

Jewels 3rd Ring was an event held on May 16, 2009 at Shinjuku Face in Tokyo, Japan.

Results

Jewels 4th Ring

Jewels 4th Ring was an event held on July 11, 2009 at Shin-Kiba 1st Ring in Tokyo, Japan.

Results

Jewels 5th Ring

Jewels 5th Ring was an event held on September 13, 2009 at Shinjuku Face in Tokyo, Japan.

Results

Jewels 6th Ring

Jewels 6th Ring was an event held on December 11, 2009 at Shinjuku Face in Tokyo, Japan.

Results

See also 
 Jewels

References

Jewels (mixed martial arts) events
2009 in mixed martial arts